The New Yam Festival of the Igbo people (Orureshi in the idoma area, Iwa ji, Iri ji or Ike ji, Otute depending on dialect) is an annual cultural festival by the Igbo people that is held at the end of the rainy season in early August.

The Iri ji festival (literally "new-yam eating") is practiced throughout West Africa (especially in Nigeria and Ghana) and other African countries and beyond. It symbolizes the conclusion of a harvest and the beginning of the next work cycle. The celebration is a cultural occasion tying individual Igbo communities together as essentially agrarian and dependent on yam.

Igbo tradition 

Yams are among the first set of crops to be planted at the beginning of the planting season. Between April and August, early crops such as maize, cocoyams, and pumpkins are harvested and eaten without fanfare. The New Yam Festival is, therefore, a celebration depicting the prominence of yam in the social-cultural life of the Igbo people. In some Igbo communities, all old yams (from the previous year's crop) must be consumed or discarded on the eve of the New Yam Festival. The next day, only dishes of yam are served at the feast, as the festival is symbolic of the abundance of the produce.

Though the style and methods may differ from one community to the next, the essential components that make up the festival remain the same. In some communities, the celebration lasts a whole day, while in many places it may last a week or more. These festivities normally include a variety of entertainments and ceremonies, including the performance of rites by the Igwe (King), or the eldest man, and cultural dances by Igbo men, women, and their children. The festival features Igbo cultural activities in the form of contemporary shows, masquerade dances, and fashion parades.

Ịwa-ji ceremony 

Usually, at the beginning of the festival, the yams are offered to the gods and ancestors first before distributing them to the villagers. The ritual is performed either by the oldest man in the community or by the king or eminent titleholder. This man also offers the yams to god, deities, and ancestors by showing gratitude to the supreme deity for his protection and kindness in leading them from lean periods to the time of bountiful harvest without deaths resulting from hunger.  After the prayer of thanksgiving to their god, they eat the first yam because It is believed that their position bestows the privilege of being intermediaries between their communities and the gods of the land. The rituals are meant to express the gratitude of the community to the gods for making the harvest possible, and they are widely followed despite more modern changes due to the influence of Christianity in the area. This, therefore, explains the three aspects of the Igbo worldview, that they are pragmatic, religious, and appreciative.

The day is symbolic of enjoyment after the cultivation season, and the plenty is shared with friends and well-wishers. A variety of festivities mark the eating of new yam. Folk dances, masquerades, parades, and parties create an experience that some participants characterize as "art"; the colorful festival is a spectacle of exhibited joy, thanks, and community display.

The yam used for the main ritual at the festival is usually roasted and served with palm oil (mmanụ nri). Iwa ji also shares some similarities with the Asian Mid-Autumn Festival, as both are based on the cycles of the moon and are essentially community harvest festivals.

This event is important in the calendar of Igbo people all over the world.

The harvest of yam and the celebration of the gods of the land through the New Yam festival is an epitome of the people's religious belief in the supreme deity. The coming of the new moon in August marks the preparation for the great "Iri Ji Ohu" festival, but the time and mode of preparation differs from community to community. 

The New Yam festival is a highly captivating art event. The colourful festival is a visual spectacle of coherence, of dance, of joy and feasting, an annual display for community members, to mark the end of the cultivation season, a festival where the people express their gratitude to those that helped them reap a bountiful harvest.

See also 

 Ikeji festival
 Ito Ogbo Festival

References

External links

Igbo culture
Igbo society
Food and drink festivals in Ghana
Yam festivals
Food and drink festivals in Nigeria
August observances
Religious festivals in Africa
Festivals in Ghana
Cultural festivals in Nigeria
Festivals in Nigeria